Alcea setosa, the bristly hollyhock, is an ornamental plant in the family Malvaceae.

The bristly hollyhock is native to the Levant: ranging from Crete, Turkey, Lebanon and Syria to the botanical region of Palestine (including Israel and Jordan). The part above ground of the plant withers and dies in the summer. In the winter, a rosette of flowers develops and a vertical flowering stem grows out of it. The pink flowers are numerous and large, while in the Galilee and the Carmel the flowers are darker and in the Gilboa and Samaria the flowers are lighter. In the Mount Lebanon, flowers ranging from dark pink to white can be found. The whole plant is bristly, hence its common name. The plant flowers from April until June.

In folk medicine, the liquid of the plant is used to treat injuries, burns, coughs and inflammation. The flower buds are edible, cooked and raw, and are considered as medicine for sicknesses in the airways. 
In Lebanese villages, Bristly hollyhock flowers are dried in the sun, then mixed with other herbs and wild flowers, prepared as concoctions, and served as tea drinks.

References

setosa
Flora of Crete
Flora of European Turkey
Flora of Turkey
Flora of Cyprus
Flora of Lebanon and Syria
Flora of Palestine (region)
Taxa named by Pierre Edmond Boissier
Taxa named by Friedrich Alefeld

Flora of Israel
Flora of Jordan